This is a list of members of the European Parliament for Latvia for the 2014-2019 Parliament.

See 2014 European Parliament election in Latvia for further information on these elections in Latvia.

List 

'Points' are calculated from votes cast for a candidate's lists minus 'crossings-out' and adding 'pluses'

Source:

References 

2014
List
Latvia